Stadtgymnasium Altstadt-Kneiphof  was a Gymnasium in the Kneiphof quarter of Königsberg, Germany.

History

Despite some resistance, the school was established by merging Altstadt Gymnasium and Kneiphof Gymnasium on 6 January 1923, with classes held at the latter's location north of Königsberg Cathedral. Its first and only director was Dr. Arthur Mentz. Educational projects were first held at the chine Gausupschlucht near Rauschen in 1928, and it partnered with the Deutsche Gymnasium for Baltic Germans in Jelgava, Latvia, in 1929.

The building was destroyed during the 1944 bombing of Königsberg in World War II. Classes continued to be taught by its instructors until the closing of all city schools on 23 January 1945. The Stadtgymnasium's traditions were sponsored in the postwar era by the Ratsgymnasium of Hanover.

Notes

References

1944 disestablishments in Germany
Buildings and structures in Germany destroyed during World War II
Defunct schools in Germany
Education in Königsberg
Educational institutions established in 1923
Educational institutions disestablished in 1944
Former buildings and structures in Königsberg
Gymnasiums in Germany
1923 establishments in Germany